Marcillac-Lanville is a commune in the Charente department in southwestern France.

Population

See also
Communes of the Charente department
 Canadian Prime Ministers Pierre and Justin Trudeau can trace their family roots to Marcillac-Lanville

References

Communes of Charente